Marko Stančetić (born 22 July 1989) is a Serbian football winger who plays for Cement Beočin.

Honours
Napredak Kruševac
Serbian First League: 2015–16

External links
 
 Marko Stančetić stats at utakmica.rs 
 

1989 births
Living people
Footballers from Novi Sad
Serbian footballers
FK Vojvodina players
FK Sloga Temerin players
FK Proleter Novi Sad players
FK Palić players
FK Mačva Šabac players
FK Cement Beočin players
FK Spartak Subotica players
FK Radnički Sombor players
RFK Novi Sad 1921 players
FK Napredak Kruševac players
Serbian First League players
Serbian expatriate footballers
Serbian expatriate sportspeople in Greece
Expatriate footballers in Greece
A.E. Karaiskakis F.C. players
Association football wingers